The Geo-Informatics and Space Technology Development Agency (Public Organization) or, in brief, GISTDA, is a Thai space agency and space research organisation. It is responsible for remote sensing and technology development satellites.

It has its offices in Chaeng Watthana Government Complex, Bangkok.

History 
In 1971, Thailand had a satellite natural resource survey project by joining the NASA ERTS-1, which is a project of the National Aeronautics and Space Administration (NASA) under the operation of the National Research Council of Thailand at that time. Due to the success of the project, the status of the project has changed is the division level name to "Satellite Natural Resources Survey Division" in 1979.

In 2000, the Ministry of Science Technology and Environment has set up a new space technology unit by combining the Satellite Natural Resources Survey Division of Office of the National Research Council and the Department of Coordination and Promotion of Geographic information system Development Information Center of the Office of the Permanent Secretary for Science Technology and Environment, into the name of Geo-Informatics and Space Technology Development Agency (Public Organization).

Satellite programs

THEOS
GISTDA owns the THEOS satellite, which was launched by a Dnepr rocket from the Dombarovskiy Cosmodrome in Russia on 1 October 2008.

THEOS-2
In June 2018, GISTDA selected Airbus to build the THEOS-2 satellite, an observation satellite that will replace THEOS satellite.

See also
 List of government space agencies

References

External links
New GISTDA English language website

Space agencies
Scientific organizations based in Thailand
Public organizations of Thailand
Remote sensing organizations
Space program of Thailand